Savane is a free web-based software hosting system. It includes issue tracking (bugs, tasks, support, news and documentation), project member management by roles and individual account maintenance.

History 

The GNU Project's GNU Savannah website started out using SourceForge as its hosting software.  However, after Savannah was set up, SourceForge was changed into proprietary software by its authors. Loïc Dachary, main site's administrator at the Free Software Foundation, forked the software in order to maintain it.

This software fork was originally called simply Savannah, since it was the software running the GNU Project's Savannah website and had no other name.

Professor of Physics at the University of Porto Jaime E. Villate installed an instance of this software at CERN for the interest of the Worldwide LHC Computing Grid. From this point, CERN regularly hired GNU project contributor Mathieu Roy to work under the guidance of CERN developer Yves Perrin to improve the software so it would fit the needs to use it to coordinate software developments related to the Worldwide LHC Computing Grid.
It was first released in February 2004 under the name Savane, the French word for "savannah", to distinguish the software from the two main instances GNU Savannah and CERN Savannah.

The latest major public release (3.0) was made in December 2006. Since then, the project failed to recruit new developers while Mathieu Roy and Yves Perrin lost interest in its development. Sylvain Beucler took the project over to ultimately decide, in 2013, to work on FusionForge, another fork of SourceForge, instead.

Installations 

 GNU Savannah  provides the software development and issue tracking platform for GNU Projects, under the umbrella of the Free Software Foundation, but also to non-GNU projects.

 Gna!  provided a software development and issue tracking platform, under the umbrella of the Free Software Foundation France.

 CERN Savannah  provides the platform for issue tracking and workflow control for the software developments related to the LHC Computing Grid project, LHC being the Large Hadron Collider currently being built at CERN (European Organization for Nuclear Research) near Geneva.

References 

Free groupware
Free project management software
Software forks